Easier Said may refer to:

"Easier Said", a song by Goran Kralj from Any Day Now (2004)
"Easier Said", a song by Prolyphic & Reanimator from The Ugly Truth (2008)
"Easier Said", a song by Sunflower Bean (2016)
"Easier Said", a song by Alessia Cara from The Pains of Growing (2018)